Justice McWhorter may refer to:

George G. McWhorter, associate justice of the Florida Supreme Court
Henry C. McWhorter, associate justice of the Supreme Court of Appeals of West Virginia